WITY (980 AM) is a stand-alone radio station which began broadcasting in 1953 in Danville, Illinois, United States, owned by Illiana Communications, LLC.  The format is adult hits with daily farm programming.  Coverage extends west from Danville, Illinois, to Champaign-Urbana, North to Kankakee, South to Charleston-Mattoon, and East to Crawfordsville, Indiana.

History
November 24, 1953, saw the advent of WITY on the airwaves.  The station was one of three sister stations owned in conjunction by Louis Metzlaff, John Axe, and Gil Metzger.  The sister stations were WITE in Linton, Indiana, and WITZ in Jasper, Indiana; however, WITY is now independently owned and operated locally.

References

External links

ITY
Danville, Illinois